VSW may refer to:
 Very Short Wave, a form of Very high frequency
 Vertical Search Works, a semantic web search company
 Vanderbilt spoken word, a spoken word performance organization at Vanderbilt University
 .vsw, a file extension for Visio Workspace files
 Visual Studies Workshop, an arts organization in Rochester, NY